Tales from the Hood 3 is a 2020 American horror-comedy anthology film written and directed by Rusty Cundieff and Darin Scott and executive-produced by Spike Lee. The film is the sequel to Cundieff and Scott's 2018 horror anthology Tales from the Hood 2.

The wraparound story is "The Mouths of Babes and Demons" while the segments are "Ruby Gates", "The Bunker", "Operatic" and "Dope Kicks". "The Mouths of Babes and Demons", "The Bunker" and "Dope Kicks" were written and directed by Rusty Cundieff while "Ruby Gates" and "Operatic" were written and directed by Darin Scott.

Story

"The Mouths of Babes and Demons" (beginning)

A lumbering man named William (Tony Todd) escorts a young child named Brooklyn (Sage Arrindelle) through the woods and into an abandoned building, as they are both on the run from the “bad things”, an evil force that is pursuing them. To distract William from the impending danger, Brooklyn tells him stories.

"Ruby Gates"

Slumlord David Burr (London Brown), owner of the Ruby Gates apartment complex, plans to bulldoze it and replace it with high-rent condos. A wrench is thrown in his plans, however, by the only people left in the building: The Bradfords, who refuse to move so as not to aggravate their son's cancer. With his boss threatening to sue him for fraud and time running out, Burr hires an associate of his, a disturbed arsonist, to start a fire to scare the Bradfords out of their apartment. Unfortunately, it goes wrong and results in them burning to death, and their ghosts begin to haunt Burr, seeking revenge on him.

"The Bunker"

Denton Wilbury (Cooper Huckabee), an absolute bigot, spends his days living like a hermit in an isolated bunker in the middle of nowhere. He runs his own radio show to broadcast various rants of white supremacy, and occasionally comes off to threaten people who seem to congregate outside his bunker, apparently being in a standoff with them. As Denton grows increasingly unstable and unhinged, things build up to a surprise twist.

"Operatic"

Aspiring pop singer Chela Simpson (Savannah Basley) is hired as a caretaker by Marie Benoit (Lynn Whitfield), an elderly and wealthy former opera singer. Marie only had one role in her career: the lead in Carmen. In spite of her talent, her career was destroyed by backlash against a black woman playing the lead. Though the two singers seem to come to a bond, Chela and her manager/boyfriend Park (Jaime M. Callica) conspire to murder her and steal her fortune. But not everything is as it seems, as Marie may or may not have ulterior motives.

"Dope Kicks"

Percy Woodhouse (Patrick Abellard) is a criminal nicknamed the Punch & Run Bandit. He is known for brutally assaulting and then robbing his victims, whether they be children, adults, or in the case of his latest target, an elderly grandmother. The old woman's granddaughter, in a furious rage, curses the person responsible to "walk a mile in their victim's shoes". After beating a man to death and stealing his gold shoes, Percy finds that the shoes won’t come off, and he seems to be exhibiting various symptoms related to death, almost as if the curse is making him literally walk in his victim's shoes. Percy attempts to apologize to the owner's shoes as it is the only way to break the curse, but the morgue collects the victim's body and begin cutting into it, killing Percy and trapping his soul for all eternity.

"The Mouths of Babes and Demons" (ending)

It's revealed that William is a child murderer who was about to make Brooklyn his next victim until he was surrounded by the ghosts of his past child victims who dismember him with axes. Brooklyn reveals that she's an actual demon sent to claim William's soul and the Bad Things were her escorts. The souls of William's victims head to heaven while Brooklyn claims Williams's head/soul for herself. At the end of the film, Brooklyn turns to the camera and says "Do you want to hear a story" with flaming eyes and laughs manically.

Cast

Production
Describing the film, Cundieff told the podcast Pod of Madness, "The stories, you know, they're not as big as the first Tales. But I do think that the stories are stronger, overall, than the second one, and the look of the film is better, a lot to do with the locations that we found." The film was shot in Winnipeg, Canada.

See also
 List of hood films

References

External links

2020 films
2020 comedy horror films
African-American comedy horror films
American horror anthology films
Films directed by Rusty Cundieff
Films scored by Frederik Wiedmann
Hood films
2020s English-language films
2020s American films
Films set in bunkers